Scram (or SCRAM) is an emergency shutdown of a nuclear reactor or a complex operation.

Scram or SCRAM may also refer to:

Arts, entertainment, and media
 Scram (video game), a 1981 Atari 8-bit family game based around shutdown of a nuclear reactor
 Scram Cricket, a variation of the darts game Cricket
 Scram!, a 1932 Laurel and Hardy short film

People 
 Scram Jones (born 1977), producer, DJ and emcee

Technology
 SCRAM bracelet, an ankle bracelet for Secure Continuous Remote Alcohol Monitoring
 Salted Challenge Response Authentication Mechanism (or SCRAM), a computer security mechanism used with the Simple Authentication and Security Layer
 Scram cannon, a hypothetical kinetic energy weapon based on ram accelerator technology
 Scramjet,  the flow of and combustion of the fuel/air mixture through the engine at supersonic speeds
 Static column RAM (or SCRAM), a type of computer memory

See also
Scrum (disambiguation)